Lawless Land is a 1937 American Western film directed by Albert Ray and starring Johnny Mack Brown and Louise Stanley. Originally made by Supreme Pictures in 1936, it was released by Republic Pictures the following year.

Cast 
 Johnny Mack Brown as Ranger Jeff Hayden
 Louise Stanley as Letty Winston
 Ted Adams as Clay Wheeler
 Julian Rivero as Henchman Ortego
 Horace Murphy as Storekeeper Lafe Spooner
 Frank Ball as Saloon owner Bill
 Ed Cassidy as Sheriff Jim
 Anita Camargo as Lolita

Soundtrack 
 The Chiquita Hernandez Orchestra "La Cacuracha"

External links 
 
 

1937 films
1937 Western (genre) films
American Western (genre) films
American black-and-white films
Republic Pictures films
Films directed by Albert Ray
1930s English-language films
1930s American films